Sports Stadium is located in Majuro, Marshall Islands. The stadium's capacity is around 2,000. It is an indoor stadium, the ECC (Educational Cultural Center) and used principally for basketball and volleyball, and rarely for soccer matches. Stadium has 3 pinned arch roof spanning 60m.
The ECC was forced to close down following part of the roof collapsing in June, 2011. Main reason behind the roof problem was due to termite infestation.

References 

Soccer venues in the Marshall Islands
Indoor arenas in the Marshall Islands
Basketball venues in the Marshall Islands
Volleyball venues in the Marshall Islands